The Walkman ZX Series is a line of premium high-end digital audio players designed and developed by Sony since 2013. It sits above the A Series and below the luxury WM1 Series in the Walkman range.

History

The first model, NW-ZX1, featured a 4-inch display and a high quality digital amplifier that sold for about $900. It runs on Android. It was introduced on September 25, 2013, alongside the NW-F880 series and first released in Japan on December 7, followed by overseas markets in 2014.

A second generation player, the NW-ZX2, was released in 2015.

Later in the same year, the NW-ZX100 was introduced. This player is cheaper than the ZX2, has a more compact and slimmer body, and runs on custom Sony software.

In 2017 the NW-ZX300 replaced the NW-ZX100. It is slimmer than the ZX100 and borrows design cues from the A Series of the same time. It also includes a 4.4 mm Pentaconn connector.

The NW-ZX500 series was introduced at IFA 2019, retailing for €830/£750, with native DSD and MQA playback. It also had a USB-C port replacing the proprietary WM-PORT for data and power connection.

The NW-ZX700 series was introduced in January 2023. It has been released in select Asia-Pacific countries in January such as India, and will be released in Japan on February 23 for ¥104,500.

Reception
What Hi-Fi? reviewed the NW-ZX1, praising the sound, design and buttons, while criticising its price and non-expandable memory. PC World Australia gave the player 3.5 stars out of 5, giving merit to sound quality and battery life, but noting that the buying price is steep.

In What Hi-Fi?'s early review of the NW-ZX507, its "detailed and dynamic sound" was praised, with no negatives given.

Specification and comparison

See also
List of Sony Walkman products

References

Sony products
Digital audio players
Portable media players